AFAP may refer to:
 Actin filament-associated protein
 Attenuated familial adenomatous polyposis
 Australian Federation of Air Pilots
 Internet slang for as far as possible
 Artillery fired atomic projectile, a type of tactical nuclear weapon